Kamil Ellis is an Australian actor. He has appeared on TV in Cleverman, Nowhere Boys,  Bushwhacked!, and SeaChange. He was an original cast member of the stage play The Secret River. He is of Wiradjuri Aboriginal descent.

Together with the Ensemble Offspring he was nominated for the 2019 ARIA Award for Best Children's Album for Classic Kids: Music For The Dreaming. Ellis appeared as a police officer alongside Jamie Dornan and Danielle Macdonald in the limited series, The Tourist in 2022.

Discography

Albums

Awards and nominations

ARIA Music Awards
The ARIA Music Awards is an annual awards ceremony that recognises excellence, innovation, and achievement across all genres of Australian music.

|-
| ARIA Music Awards of 2019
| Classic Kids: Music for the Dreaming 
| ARIA Award for Best Children's Album
| 
|-

References

Living people
Australian male television actors
Indigenous Australian male actors
Year of birth missing (living people)